The Talbot-Darracq 56 was a voiturette race a car, designed, developed and built by British-French manufacturer Talbot-Darracq, in 1921.

References

1921 in motorsport
Talbot vehicles
Grand Prix cars